St. Paul's Episcopal Church, built in the late 1760s, is a historic Episcopal church located at 5486 St. Paul's Road, off Virginia Route 206 in the Owens area of King George, Virginia, United States. It is the parish church of historic St. Paul's Parish which was formed in the early 1660s. On  May 25, 1973, St. Paul's was added to the National Register of Historic Places.

National Register listing
St. Paul's Church ** (added 1973 - Building - #73002028)
W of Owens off VA 206, Owens
Historic Significance: 	Event, Architecture/Engineering
Architect, builder, or engineer: 	Unknown
Architectural Style: 	Colonial
Area of Significance: 	Architecture, Religion
Period of Significance: 	1750-1799
Owner: 	Private
Historic Function: 	Religion
Historic Sub-function: 	Religious Structure
Current Function: 	Religion
Current Sub-function: 	Religious Structure

Current use
St. Paul's Church is still in use as a parish of the Episcopal Diocese of Virginia. The rector of the parish is the Reverend (Padre) Lee Gandiya.

See also

 List of Registered Historic Places in Virginia, Counties H-M
 St. Paul's Episcopal Church (disambiguation)

Gallery

References

External links
St. Paul's website
St. Paul's Church (Episcopal), State Routes 206 & 218, Owens, King George County, VA: 2 data pages at Historic American Buildings Survey

18th-century Episcopal church buildings
Churches in King George County, Virginia
Episcopal churches in Virginia
Georgian architecture in Virginia
Historic American Buildings Survey in Virginia
National Register of Historic Places in King George County, Virginia
Churches on the National Register of Historic Places in Virginia
Churches completed in 1766